Dzivarasekwa is a suburb of western Harare, Zimbabwe.

History 
Dzivarasekwa is a suburb of Harare that was set up on the site and services approach. It is represented as the constituency of Dzivarasekwa. It consists of Dzivarasekwa 1, 2, 3, 4 and Dzivarasekwa Extension. The latter is a squatted informal settlement in wetlands on the periphery of the suburb.

By 2021, the government had introduced a plan to build 88 blocks each holding 14 flats, as part of a slum upgrading plan for Dzivarasekwa.

It is also popular for its nyau groups namely villa 1, yellow yellow and many other small groups. Widely known nyau people from the suburb include Brongo, Charisi, Diva Chikarire and Rasi.

Night life is vibrant in the suburb with Dzivaresekwa 1 infamous for prostitutes, and Suncity bar and Hub24 bar & grill being the go to places for revellers.

Notable inhabitants 
Tendai Biti
Bronson Gengezha
Obert Bakasa 
Tindo Mariro
Somandla Ndebele
Inno Sauti
Monalisa Mashonga

References 

Suburbs of Harare